Upstairs at Eric's is the debut studio album by English synth-pop duo Yazoo (known in North America as Yaz). It was released on 20 August 1982 by Mute Records. It was produced by the band and E.C. Radcliffe, with assistance from Mute label boss Daniel Miller on some of the tracks. Named after producer Radcliffe's Blackwing Studios where the album was recorded, Upstairs at Eric's was preceded by two UK top-three singles, the ballad "Only You" and the more uptempo "Don't Go". The album reached number two on the UK Albums Chart and has been certified platinum by the British Phonographic Industry (BPI), denoting shipments in excess of 300,000 copies in the United Kingdom.

Against the group's wishes, "Situation", originally the B-side of "Only You" in the UK and Europe, was released as the band's debut single in the United States and Canada, where a remixed version of the song by DJ François Kevorkian reached number one on Billboard Club Play Singles chart. "Situation" peaked at number 73 on the US Billboard Hot 100, while it reached the top 40 in Canada, peaking at number 31. The North American version of the album subsequently replaced the remixed version of "Situation" for the UK album track "Tuesday". Upstairs at Eric's reached number 92 on the Billboard 200 in the US and number 49 on RPM albums chart in Canada.

Recording and composition 
Following the success of their debut single "Only You", Vince Clarke and Alison Moyet rapidly recorded the album to maintain their . As Clarke's only previous experience of a recording studio had been Blackwing Studios in south-east London, where he had made Depeche Mode's debut album Speak & Spell, his immediate thought was to record Yazoo's album there as well: he said later, "I didn't know of any other studios, so I just assumed that Blackwing was the only studio I could record at". However, when the duo arrived at Blackwing they found that not only was Daniel Miller unavailable to produce the album, contrary to Clarke's expectations, but the main studios had already been booked out during the daytime by Fad Gadget, another Mute label act. Instead Clarke and Moyet had to record the album in the early mornings with studio owner Eric (E.C.) Radcliffe overseeing most of the recording process, turning up around 5 or 6 a.m. and working through until 11 a.m. each day in whichever of the two studio spaces were available at the time.

On the 30th anniversary of Upstairs at Eric's in 2012 Clarke told The Quietus that there had been no grand plan for the album's creation:

Clarke's compositions "I Before E Except After C" and "In My Room" explore the use of cut-up vocals, including his own spoken word voice. "I Before E Except After C" features both Moyet and the mother of producer Eric Radcliffe separately reading out the instruction manual for one of the pieces of studio equipment, with Moyet struggling to keep herself from laughing.

Moyet later described how her song "Goodbye 70's" had been inspired by her disillusionment with how the late-1970s punk scene had turned out, saying, "'Goodbye 70's' is about punk and not caring how you were dressed, and then I discovered that so many of my friends that I'd thought it all really meant something to just saw it as another trend... That's what 'Goodbye 70's' was all about, about how sour the whole thing became."

Artwork 
The album cover depicts two mannequins in a sparsely furnished loft, facing each other over a table, with the lower part of the dummies' bodies seated on chairs while the upper portions are perched on the edges of the table. It was shot by photographer Joe Lyons at his first photo studio in north London, and he described how he had set up the shot:

The original UK CD release of Upstairs at Eric's in 1986 featured a close-up of part of the original album cover. Another photograph from the same session was used as the cover for the Yazoo box set In Your Room in 2008.

Critical reception 

From contemporary reviews, Melody Maker hailed Upstairs at Eric's as "an album of rich, dark passion, forever burying the hoary old moan that electronics and synthesizers will never be any good because they don't have a button on the front that says 'emotion'".

Lynn Hanna of NME was more critical, feeling that "Upstairs at Eric's is an LP of trial and some error, and it shows all the signs of a collaboration that's still in a promising infancy. The writing is divided almost equally between the two, and at their best each acts as an excellent foil to the other... A little too often, though, this LP speaks of two disparate pasts rather than one new Yazoo facing the future." Ken Tucker of The Philadelphia Inquirer gave the album a one star out of five rating, referred to Yaz as "stiff-voiced monotony fans" and saying that the group were "even more pretentious than most, working the Lord's Prayer into [their] tedious synthesizer rhythms."

From retrospective reviews, David Jeffries of AllMusic compared the album with Clarke's other debut with Depeche Mode the previous year, stating "While Speak and Spell is, by far, the more consistent record, Upstairs at Eric's is wholly more satisfying, beating the Depeche record on substance and ambition, and is light years ahead in emotion... The clumsier experimental tracks make most people head for the hits collection, but to do so would be to miss the album's great twist... Like its curious cover, Upstairs at Eric's presents a fractured, well-lit, and paranoid urban landscape."

Accolades 
Upstairs at Eric's was placed at number 6 on the NME critics' list of albums of the year for 1982, while "Only You" was listed as the number 7 single and "Don't Go" as the number 14 single that same year. The album was also named as one of Sounds magazine's top twenty albums of 1982.

In 1989 Record Mirror placed Upstairs at Eric's at number 35 on their list of the best albums of the 1980s.

Track listing 

 North American releases of Upstairs at Eric's features François Kevorkian's remix of "Situation" instead of "Tuesday". The 1990 European CD re-release appends the 12" remixes of "Situation" and "The Other Side of Love" to the above track listing. The 2018 UK box set and 2019 LP reissue contain the original LP track listing above.

Personnel 
Alison Moyet – vocals, piano
Vince Clarke – instrumentation, spoken words on "I Before E Except After C" and "In My Room"

Additional personnel
Daniel Miller – additional production and noises on "Don't Go", "Too Pieces", "In My Room", "Only You" and "Situation"
"Eric's mum" (the mother of producer Eric Radcliffe) – extra chit-chat on "I Before E Except After C"
D. Davis – extra chit-chat on "In My Room"

Charts

Weekly charts

Year-end charts

Certifications and sales

Release history

References

Bibliography

External links 
Singles information

1982 debut albums
Yazoo (band) albums
Mute Records albums
Albums produced by Eric Radcliffe
Albums produced by Vince Clarke